The European Investigative Collaborations (EIC) network is a European collaborative hybrid project of transnational investigative journalism. EIC was established in the fall of 2015 with founding members, including Der Spiegel, El Mundo, Mediapart, the Romanian Centre for Investigative Journalism (CRJI), and Le Soir, and launched in the winter of 2016. On March 18, 2016, after three months research, they published the results of their first joint investigation spurred on by the 2015 terrorist attacks in Paris, in which they revealed how in spite of security risk warnings, "the EU’s freedom of goods policy facilitated the sale of weapons leading to [the 2015] terror attacks in Paris." In 2017 working with "over 60 journalists in 14 countries", the EIC published the Football Leaks—the "largest leak in sports history".

Objective 
Through "joint reporting and publication", the EIA aims to strengthen the European transnational investigative journalism by joint reporting with the utmost transparency. They exchange documents and articles and coordinate publication, and to improve the tools used in their investigations from one investigation to another—for example in their data processing capabilities, servers, secure forums, etc.

Members 
 Falter (Austria)
 Mediapart (France)
 El Mundo (Spain)
 Politiken (Denmark)
 Le Soir (Belgium)
 Der Spiegel (Germany)
 L'Espresso (Italy)
 NRC Handelsblad (Netherlands)
 Dagen Nyheter (Sweden)
 Nacional (Croatia)
 Expresso (Portugal)
 The Black Sea (Romania)

History
At Dataharvest 2015 and other networking events, discussions related to "establishing this European Network" started with "Jörg Schmitt, Jürgen Dahlkamp, Alfred Weinzierl and Klaus Brinkbäumer from Der Spiegel and Stefan Candea from the Romanian Centre for Investigative Journalism (CRJI). Stefan Candea, a founding partner explained how following the terrorist attacks, such as the November 2015 Paris attacks, journalists "started to bounce ideas off each other." This led to their first collaborative transnational investigation resulting in the series Mapping the Weapons of Terror. Others joined the group, including, "Alain Lallemand from Le Soir, John Hansen from Politiken, Milorad Ivanovic from Newsweek Serbia, Florian Klenk from Falter, Paula Guisado from El Mundo, Vlad Odobescu from The Romanian Centre for Investigative Journalism, Michael Bird from The Black Sea, Fabrice Arfi from Mediapart and Vittorio Malagutti from L'Espresso. By 2017, NRC Handelsblad in the Netherlands had joined along with dozens of European media and over forty investigative journalists.

The Black Sea
The Black Sea, led by "award winning journalists and photo-journalists from the Romanian Centre for Investigative Journalism (CRJI)", is "a web project bringing together journalists, photographers and videographers.

Investigations

Mapping the Weapons of Terror (March 2016)

After three months of research On March 18, 2016, EIC journalists published "Mapping the Weapons of Terror" in which they revealed how a "shadow gun market" in East Europe fuelled "terrorism in the west, as criminal gangs use legal loopholes and open borders to traffic weapons." They revealed how in spite of security risk warnings, "the EU’s freedom of goods policy facilitated the sale of weapons leading to [the 2015] terror attacks in Paris."

Football Leaks (2016/2017)

The EIC working with "over 60 journalists in 14 countries" published a "series of articles called Football Leaks—the "largest leak in sports history". Football Leaks "led to the prosecution of football superstar Cristiano Ronaldo and coach Jose Mourinho."

Malta Files (2017) 
In May 2017, European Investigative Collaborations published Malta Files, an investigation into "how the Mediterranean state works as a pirate base for tax avoidance inside the EU. Although profiting from the advantages of EU membership, Malta also welcomes large companies and wealthy private clients who try to dodge taxes in their home countries."

Among those included in the reports are Italian mafia figures, Russian billionaires and the families of both Turkey's president and prime minister.

See also
 Football Leaks
 International Consortium of Investigative Journalists

References

External links 
 Official Website

News leaks
Journalism organizations in Europe
Organizations established in 2016